Brenneriroa or Løiten brænderi is a village in Løten Municipality in Innlandet county, Norway. The historic Løten Church lies about half-way between the two villages.

The village is known as Løiten brænderi after the well-know distillery that once was located in the western part of the village. The eastern part of the village is also known as Slettmoen.

References

Løten
Villages in Innlandet